Johan Oskar Torgny Larsson (born 25 July 1992) is a Swedish professional ice hockey forward for the Brynäs IF of the Swedish Hockey League (SHL). He has previously played with the Minnesota Wild, Buffalo Sabres, Arizona Coyotes and Washington Capitals of the National Hockey League (NHL).

Playing career 
Larsson was drafted in the second round, 56th overall, by the Minnesota Wild of the National Hockey League (NHL) in the 2010 NHL Entry Draft. The same year, Larsson was also drafted in the fifth round of the 2010 KHL Junior Draft, as 111th overall, by the Metallurg Novokuznetsk.

Larsson made his Elitserien debut on 16 September 2010 against Modo Hockey. A week later, on September 23, against Djurgårdens IF, he recorded his first Elitserien point, being the second assist in a goal, tying the game 2–2. His first Elitserien goal was scored on January 15, 2011, against goaltender Joacim Eriksson of Skellefteå AIK.

On 1 October 2010, Larsson signed a two-year contract with Brynäs IF's elite team, which expired after the 2011–12 Elitserien season. Larsson's seven goals and 15 assists in the first 29 games of the 2011–12 season led to a nomination for that season's Elitserien Rookie of the Year award. He would then win the award. With 9 points in 16 playoff games, his team went on to win the Swedish Championship that year.

On 18 May 2011, Larsson signed a three-year contract with the Minnesota Wild, but was loaned to Brynäs for the 2011–12 season.

With the intention of pursuing his NHL career, Larsson relocated to North America, and was directly assigned to the Wild's American Hockey League (AHL) affiliate, the Houston Aeros, to begin the 2012–13 season due to the lockout. Larsson was recalled to the Wild during the shortened season as an injury replacement and made his NHL debut against the Detroit Red Wings on February 17, 2013.

On 3 April 2013 at the trade deadline, Larsson was acquired by the Buffalo Sabres along with goaltender Matt Hackett, a first-round pick in 2013 (Nikita Zadorov) and a second-round pick in 2014 (Brycen Martin) from the Wild in exchange for Jason Pominville and a fourth-round pick in 2014.

Larsson has on several occasions participated in Sweden's national teams, including the junior teams as well as the senior team. In the 2010 World U18 Championships, Larsson and his Sweden were placed second after the United States, losing the final against them.

The Sabres re-signed Larsson in the summer before the 2017–18 season to a two-year, $1.475 million contract. During the 2017–18 season, Larsson was suspended for two games on 2 February 2018 for cross checking Vincent Trocheck in a 4–2 loss to the Florida Panthers.

On 12 July 2019, the Sabres re-signed Larsson to a one-year, $1.55 million contract extension. In his eighth year within the Sabres organization in the 2019–20 season, Larsson recorded 6 goals and a career NHL high 18 points in 62 games before the season was paused and effectively ended due to the COVID-19 pandemic.

On 10 October 2020, as an unrestricted free agent from the Sabres, Larsson opted to sign a two-year, $2.8 million contract with the Arizona Coyotes.

On 21 March 2022, the day of the NHL trade deadline, the Arizona Coyotes traded Larsson to the Washington Capitals in exchange for a third-round pick. Larsson having been injured while traded by the Coyotes later returned to health and  played out the remainder of the  season with the Capitals, contributing with 6 points in 14 regular season games. He made his NHL playoff debut in the post-season, adding two assists through 6 games.

On 12 August 2022, Larsson as a free agent halted his NHL career in opting to return to his original Swedish club, Brynäs IF of the SHL, after signing a three-year, $930,000 contract.

International play 

On 30 March 2011, Larsson made his senior national team debut in an exhibition game against Latvia which ended 4–1 in Sweden's favour. In the 2012 World J20 Championships, he was the captain when Sweden won its first J20 gold medal since 1981, its second overall.

Career statistics

Regular season and playoffs

International

Awards and honours

References

External links

1992 births
Living people
Arizona Coyotes players
Brynäs IF players
Buffalo Sabres players
Houston Aeros (1994–2013) players
Minnesota Wild draft picks
Minnesota Wild players
Sportspeople from Gotland County
Rochester Americans players
Swedish expatriate ice hockey players in the United States
Swedish ice hockey forwards
Washington Capitals players